The Reading Public Library (RPL) is the main public library of the City of Reading, Pennsylvania and the district library center (DLC) of Berks County. RPL's services and collections serve the City of Reading, its suburbs, greater Berks County, and beyond.

History
Founded as an English subscription library in 1763, Reading Public Library is one of the oldest, though not continuously operating, libraries in the United States. It wasn't until 1913 that the Main Library as it currently stands was built through the generosity of Andrew Carnegie. After a major fundraising campaign in 1989, the Main Library was renovated and modernized through a variety of projects during 1990–1993. It is the sixth oldest public library in the United States.

Recognition by IMLS
In May 2018, Reading Public Library was selected as a recipient of the National Medal for Museum and Library Service by the Institute of Museum and Library Services. This award represents institutions that offer "dynamic programming and services that exceed expected levels of service" and that also "bring about change that touches the lives of individuals and helps communities thrive" through outreach to and engagement with the service population.

Branch Libraries
An increase in the number of users and the changing collection needs over the years have prompted the construction of three Branches.  Southeast Branch Library (1974), Northeast Branch Library (1974), and  Northwest Branch Library (1939). City Bookmobile services were added in 1951. The Main Library, all three Branches, and the Bookmobile readily share books and other materials to further facilitate complete coverage of the community's needs.

Website

The Reading Public Library website provides access to the library's catalog and to online collections and subscription databases. It also includes information on upcoming events such as free book talks, instruction sessions, and visiting speakers and authors. The online catalog ALIN allows users to search RPL's holdings of books and other materials as well as those of all participating libraries in Berks County.

In conjunction with Access Pennsylvania, RPL gives library cardholders free access via  POWER Library to hundreds of current and historical magazines, newspapers, journals, and reference books in subscription databases, including EBSCOhost, Grove Art Online, Grove Music Online, and ERIC.

Other databases available only from within the library include Ancestry Library, Foundation Directory, Reference USA, and Reading Eagle archives.

Resources and services

Resources
RPL offers a wide variety of print resources (Fiction, Nonfiction, Reference, Large Print, Spanish, Magazines, Government Documents) and non-print resources (CDs, CD-ROMs, DVDs, Video Cassettes, Microfilm, Databases, Reading Eagle Archives).

Services
Among RPL's many services are a fully staffed Reference Department, Inter-Library Loan capabilities, a Pennsylvania Room dedicated to history and genealogy of the local area, award-winning Children's & Young Adult Departments, regularly scheduled Instruction & Programming, and freely available Public Internet Access via desktop computers and wifi).

See also
Pennsylvania Department of Education
Office of Commonwealth Libraries
Access Pennsylvania (Union catalog of Pennsylvania's school, public, academic and special libraries)
POWER Library (Databases available to Pennsylvania library members)
 State Library of Pennsylvania
List of Berks County Libraries

References

Durham, A. R. (n.d.). History of the Reading Library 1808-1890. Unpublished manuscript, Reading Public Library, Reading, PA.
Griesemer, V. L. (1964). Two Hundred Years of Service: A History of the Reading Public Library. (Undergraduate dissertation, Albright College, 1964).
Heizmann, L. J. (1971). The library that would not die: the turbulent history of the Reading Public Library. Reading, PA: Reading Eagle Press.
Heizmann, L. J., & Hagan, C. (1988). The library that would not die: the turbulent history of the Reading Public Library. Reading, PA : Reading Eagle Press.

External links
The Reading Public Library (Homepage)
RPL Reference Services
RPL Databases (In-library access & home access)
Location & Hours

Library buildings completed in 1913
Public libraries in Pennsylvania
Library
Carnegie libraries in Pennsylvania
1763 establishments in Pennsylvania